Penny Pinchers (lit. "Penny-Pinching Romance" or "Saving Up for Romance") is a 2011 South Korean romantic comedy film written and directed Kim Jung-hwan, starring Han Ye-seul and Song Joong-ki.

Kim received a Best New Director nomination at the 48th Baeksang Arts Awards in 2012.

Plot
Chun Ji-woong is an unemployed college graduate who continually fails job interviews and lives off an allowance from his mother, who runs a small restaurant in the countryside. Ji-woong is an eternal optimist, but having no money is cramping his dating life when he can't even afford to buy a pack of condoms. Yet despite living in a tiny, dingy apartment in a low-income neighborhood, he's about to get evicted when his mother abruptly cuts him off and he can't pay the rent.

Gu Hong-sil lives in the apartment opposite Ji-woong's. Hong-sil is extremely frugal; she collects then sells recyclables, rummages through abandoned homes, steals sugar from coffee shops, and will walk anywhere within 10 kilometers (6.2 miles) to save on bus fare. She denounces all activities that involve wasting money, such as going to church and the hospital, and even dating. Romance is the last thing on Hong-sil's mind, she considers it a luxury and an unnecessary frivolity.

So she tells Ji-woong that she'll teach him the art of penny-pinching and include him in a short-term moneymaking scheme if he follows whatever she tells him to do for the next two months.

Cast
 Han Ye-seul as Gu Hong-sil
 Song Joong-ki as Chun Ji-woong
 Shin So-yul as Ha Kyung-joo
 Lee Sang-yeob as Yang Gwan-woo
 Lee Jae-won as Tae-woo
 Lee Yong-joo as Chang-geun
 Kim Dong-hyun as Hong-sil's father
 Moon Se-yoon as Sysop
 Ra Mi-ran as Ji-woong's landlady

Release
Penny Pinchers was released in theaters on November 10, 2011. It was not a big commercial success, grossing  on 424,002 admissions.

It also screened at the 4th Okinawa International Movie Festival in 2012.

References

External links 
  
 Penny Pinchers at Naver 
 Penny Pinchers at CJ Entertainment
 
 
 

2011 films
2010s Korean-language films
South Korean romantic comedy films
2010s South Korean films